Craig Brian Wishart (born 9 January 1974) is a former Zimbabwean cricketer, who played Tests and ODIs for 10 years. He played domestic cricket for Mashonaland and Midlands as well as the Zimbabwean national team.

Currently he is self-employed in Zimbabwe and plays social cricket there.

International career
Wishart made his Test debut in 1995 in Harare. He has a Test record batting score of 114, with a 22.40 batting average, and a one-day record batting score of 172 not out, achieved against Namibia in the 2003 Cricket World Cup, the sixth highest in World Cup history and the highest scored by a Zimbabwean player in ODIs.

Wishart retired in 2005, citing "stress from the problems in local cricket", and was one of a number of senior internationals to announce their retirements in protest of the local governing body's controversial decisions during the early 2000s.

References

Zimbabwean cricketers
1974 births
Living people
Zimbabwe Test cricketers
Zimbabwe One Day International cricketers
Cricketers at the 2003 Cricket World Cup
Commonwealth Games competitors for Zimbabwe
Cricketers at the 1998 Commonwealth Games
Cricketers from Harare
Mashonaland cricketers
Midlands cricketers
White Rhodesian people
White Zimbabwean sportspeople
Alumni of Falcon College